Piacentini is an Italian surname. Notable people with the surname include:

Albert Piacentini (1942-2011), French commander
Elena Piacentini (born 1969), French author
Genison Piacentini de Quadra (born 1988), Brazilian footballer
Giorgio Piacentini (born 1997), Italian footballer 
Giovanni Piacentini (born 1968), Italian footballer
John Piacentini, American psychologist
Jorge Piacentini (born 1920), Argentine sailor
Luigi Piacentini (born 1930), Italian field hockey player
Marcello Piacentini (1881–1960), Italian architect
Matteo Piacentini (born 1999), Italian football player
Pablo Piacentini (died 2017), Argentinian political scientist, journalist and activist
Pio Piacentini (1846–1928), Italian architect
Riccardo Piacentini (born 1958), Italian classical composer and pianist
Rosy Piacentini (born 1938), French former swimmer
Settimio Piacentini (1859–1921), Italian general
Valentino Piacentini (born 1978), Italian former international table tennis player

Other
Colli Piacentini ("Hills of Piacenza"), Italian wine region located at the western end of Emilia-Romagna

Italian-language surnames